Paul Walker (born 15 August 1985) is a Welsh athlete who competed in the pole vault event. He has a personal best performance of 5.45 metres.

Athletics career
Walker competed for Wales at the 2010 Commonwealth Games in Delhi, India finishing 5th and the 2014 Commonwealth Games in Glasgow, Scotland again finishing 5th.

He is also the Welsh Indoor record holder which stands at 5.45 metres.

References

1985 births
Living people
British male pole vaulters
Athletes (track and field) at the 2010 Commonwealth Games
Athletes (track and field) at the 2014 Commonwealth Games
Commonwealth Games competitors for Wales